Sunwing Airlines flies to 74 destinations, across North America, Central America, South America and the Caribbean Region from its hubs in Toronto, Montreal and other smaller airports in Canada. It has a particularly strong presence in Cuba, Dominican Republic and Mexico.

This is a list of cities Sunwing Airlines flies to as of 2019. The list includes the International Civil Aviation Organization (ICAO) code, city, country, the airport's name—with the airline's hubs and focus cities marked and future routes.

References

External links 
 
 Sunwing Airlines route map (Canada)
 Sunwing Airlines US route map

Lists of airline destinations